Roger Narvaez (born September 9, 1983) is an American mixed martial artist who competes in the Middleweight division.

Mixed martial arts career 
Narvaez began training in Brazilian jiu-jitsu in 2007 as a way to lose weight and to help keep in shape for his job as a firefighter.  He began training in mixed martial arts in 2009, making his professional debut in 2011.  Narvaez competed primarily in regional promotions across his native state of Texas where he compiled a record of 6 - 0 before signing with the UFC in the spring of 2014.

Ultimate Fighting Championship 
Narvaez made his promotional debut as a short notice replacement in a light heavyweight bout against Patrick Cummins on June 7, 2014 at UFC Fight Night 42, replacing an injured Francimar Barroso.  Cummins won the fight via second round TKO.  

Narvaez faced Luke Barnatt on November 22, 2014 at UFC Fight Night 57.  After a very even first two rounds, Narvaez had a huge third round, wobbling Barnatt with a head kick and then dropping him with a right hook.  On the ground, Barnatt was able to survive several submission attempts.  Narvaez won the bout via split decision. 

Narvaez faced Elias Theodorou on March 14, 2015 at UFC 185. After a first round in which Narvaez seemed to control, Narvaez suffered a broken arm in the second round after an attempt to block a kick from Theodorou, and was stopped with a flurry of punches shortly thereafter. In turn, Narvaez was released from the promotion.

Professional grappling career 
Narvaez was booked to compete against Dan Manasoiu in the main event of Submission Hunter Pro 81 on January 22, 2023. Narvaez lost the match by submission, a rear-naked choke.

Mixed martial arts record

|-
|Loss
|align=center|8-4
| Ike Villanueva
| KO
| Fury FC 36
| 
| align=center|1
| align=center|0:28
| Robstown, Texas, United States
|
|-
|Loss
|align=center| 8-3
|Antonio Jones
| Decision (unanimous)
|Fury FC 17
|
|align=center|5
|align=center|5:00
|San Antonio, Texas, United States
|
|-
|Win
|align=center| 8–2
| Juan Torres
| TKO (punches)
|Fury FC 14
|
|align=center|2
|align=center|3:56
|San Antonio, Texas, United States
|
|-
|Loss
|align=center| 7–2
| Elias Theodorou
| TKO (punches)
|UFC 185
|
|align=center|2
|align=center|4:07
|Dallas, Texas, United States
|
|-
| Win
|align=center| 7–1
|Luke Barnatt
| Decision (split)
|UFC Fight Night: Edgar vs. Swanson
|
|align=center|3
|align=center|5:00
|Austin, Texas, United States
|
|-
| Loss
|align=center| 6–1
|Patrick Cummins
| TKO (punches)
|UFC Fight Night: Henderson vs. Khabilov
|
|align=center|2
|align=center|2:28
|Albuquerque, New Mexico, United States
|
|-
| Win
|align=center| 6–0
|Hayward Charles
| Decision (split) 
|Legacy Fighting Championship 23
|
|align=center|3
|align=center|5:00
|San Antonio, Texas, United States
|
|-
| Win
|align=center| 5–0
|Matt Jones
| TKO (punches)
|XCP - Rocks Extreme
|
|align=center|1
|align=center|2:45
|Corpus Christi, Texas, United States
|
|-
| Win
|align=center| 4–0
|Aaron Glynn
| Submission (rear-naked choke)
|XCP - Blood & Glory
|
|align=center|1
|align=center|2:59
|Robstown, Texas, United States
|
|-
| Win
|align=center| 3–0
|Larry Hopkins
| Submission (armbar)
|UFP - Tournament of Warriors
|
|align=center|1
|align=center|2:39
|Corpus Christi, Texas, United States
|
|-
| Win
|align=center| 2–0
|Andrew Garza
| TKO (punches)
|STFC 19
|
|align=center|2
|align=center|2:56
|McAllen, Texas, United States
|
|-
| Win
|align=center| 1–0
|Julio Villareal
| TKO (punches)
|STFC 17
|
|align=center|1
|align=center|1:39
|Padre Island, Texas, United States
|
|-

See also
 List of male mixed martial artists

References

External links

Living people
1989 births
American male mixed martial artists
Mixed martial artists from Texas
Mixed martial artists utilizing boxing
Mixed martial artists utilizing Brazilian jiu-jitsu
People from Corpus Christi, Texas
Ultimate Fighting Championship male fighters
American practitioners of Brazilian jiu-jitsu